Kabirou Moussoro Moubang (born 1 September 1983) is a former professional footballer who played as a striker. Born in Cameroon, he made nine appearances for the Benin national team scoring once in 2003 and 2004.

Career
Kabirou was born in Douala, Cameroon. He played several seasons for Pau FC in the French Championnat National.

He was part of the Beninese 2004 African Nations Cup team.

References

External links

1983 births
Living people
Beninese footballers
Cameroonian footballers
Footballers from Douala
Footballers from Yaoundé
Association football forwards
Benin international footballers
2004 African Cup of Nations players
Pau FC players
FC Martigues players
Saint-Pryvé Saint-Hilaire FC players
ES Viry-Châtillon players
Beninese expatriate footballers
Beninese expatriate sportspeople in France
Expatriate footballers in France